The 2019 ABA League Playoffs was the play-off tournament that decides the winner of the 2018–19 ABA League First Division season. The playoffs had started on March 23, 2019 and ended on April 22, 2019. The winner of the play-offs, Crvena zvezda mts, qualified for the 2019–20 EuroLeague.

Qualified teams

Bracket

Semifinals

|}

Game 1

Crvena zvezda v Partizan

Cedevita v Budućnost

Game 2

Partizan v Crvena zvezda

Budućnost v Cedevita

Game 3

Crvena zvezda v Partizan

Cedevita v Budućnost

Finals

|}

Game 1

Game 2

Game 3

Game 4

Game 5

See also 
 2019 ABA League Second Division Playoffs
 2018 ABA League Playoffs
 2018–19 KK Crvena zvezda season

References

External links 
 Official website
 ABA League at Eurobasket.com

2018–19 in Serbian basketball
2018–19 in Montenegrin basketball
2018–19 in Croatian basketball